The Community Development Journal is a peer reviewed academic journal of community development. It is published by Oxford University Press.

Abstracting, indexing, and impact factor 
According to the Journal Citation Reports, the journal had an impact factor of 1.147 for 2020, ranking it 38th our of 41 in the category of Development Studies.

It is indexed in the following bibliographic databases:
 Applied Social Sciences Index & Abstracts (ASSIA)
 CAB Abstracts
 CSA Worldwide Political Science Abstracts
 Education Research Abstracts
 Forest Products Abstracts
 Forestry Abstracts
 MLA International Bibliography
 Sage Family Studies Abstracts

References

External links 
 

Community development
Oxford University Press academic journals